Reinaldo Andrés Alderete (born 17 January 1983) is an Argentine football midfielder playing for Agropecuario in the Primera Nacional.

Career
For the 2010–11 season, Alderete joined San Martín de San Juan.

References

External links
  
 Reinaldo Alderete at BDFA.com.ar 
 

1983 births
Living people
Argentine footballers
Argentine expatriate footballers
Footballers from Santa Fe, Argentina
Argentine expatriate sportspeople in Israel
Association football midfielders
Club de Gimnasia y Esgrima La Plata footballers
Maccabi Petah Tikva F.C. players
San Martín de San Juan footballers
Ferro Carril Oeste footballers
Atlético de Rafaela footballers
Rosario Central footballers
Club Atlético Independiente footballers
Club Agropecuario Argentino players
Sportivo Belgrano footballers
Argentine Primera División players
Israeli Premier League players
Expatriate footballers in Israel